Aníbal Andrés Leguizamón Espínola (born 10 January 1992), known as Aníbal Leguizamón, is an Argentine professional footballer who plays as a centre-back for Emelec.

Career
Leguizamón had a youth spell with Arsenal de Sarandí, before beginning his senior career with Torneo Argentino B's Sportivo Barracas. In 2015, Leguizamón joined Argentino of Torneo Federal A. After four goals in seventy-two fixtures across two years, Leguizamón left Argentino in June 2017 after agreeing to sign for Defensores de Belgrano. He went on to score five goals against Gimnasia y Esgrima (2), Unión de Sunchales, Sarmiento and Estudiantes. On 20 June 2018, Leguizamón joined Primera B Nacional ex-club Arsenal de Sarandí. His professional debut arrived on 15 September during a defeat to Instituto.

In June 2019, Leguizamón headed to Ecuador with Serie A's Emelec on loan. He made his bow on 13 July against Fuerza Amarilla, scoring an own-goal within the first minute prior to coming off injured after seventeen. Upon returning from injury, Leguizamón made a total of twelve appearances across his twelve-month temporary spell and ended it as club captain. On 17 June 2020, Emelec activated their purchase option for Leguizamón.

Personal life
Leguizamón is the nephew of former footballers Darío Espínola and Oscar Espínola.

Career statistics
.

Honours
Arsenal de Sarandí
Primera B Nacional: 2018–19

References

External links

1992 births
Living people
People from Quilmes Partido
Argentine sportspeople of Paraguayan descent
Argentine footballers
Association football defenders
Argentine expatriate footballers
Expatriate footballers in Ecuador
Argentine expatriate sportspeople in Ecuador
Torneo Argentino B players
Torneo Federal A players
Primera C Metropolitana players
Primera Nacional players
Ecuadorian Serie A players
Argentino de Quilmes players
Defensores de Belgrano de Villa Ramallo players
Arsenal de Sarandí footballers
C.S. Emelec footballers
Sportspeople from Buenos Aires Province